Tomorrow Is Forever is a 1946 black-and-white romance film directed by Irving Pichel, and starring Claudette Colbert, Orson Welles and George Brent. It was also the film debut of Richard Long and Natalie Wood. It was distributed by RKO Radio Pictures and was based upon the 1943 serialized novel of the same name by Gwen Bristow.

Plot
Elizabeth (Colbert) and John (Welles) are a married couple, recently separated when John goes off to fight in World War I. When Elizabeth receives notice of John's death just before Christmas 1918, she reluctantly marries Lawrence Hamilton (Brent). Elizabeth tells Hamilton that she could never love him the way she loves John, but the two marry and decide to raise the child she is carrying from John as their own.

John, however, is still alive, but after being disfigured in the war he has undergone plastic surgery, making him almost unrecognizable. He is nursed back to health by Dr. Ludwig. Twenty years later, he returns to America as Erich Kessler and begins working at Hamilton's company, unaware that he married Elizabeth. Kessler is accompanied by his eight-year old foster daughter, Margaret (Wood), whose parents had been  Dr. Ludwig and his wife.

During a luncheon at Hamilton's house, Kessler is stunned to meet Mrs. Hamilton and realizes it is Elizabeth. He quickly deduces that the Hamilton's 20-year old son Drew (Long) is his own.

After Germany invades Poland, Drew is anxious to go to Canada and join the Royal Air Force. Kessler is supportive of Drew's ideas but Elizabeth is horrified at the thought of losing her son the way she lost her husband. She begins to suspect that Kessler is actually John and confronts him with her suspicion. He denies his identity. Elizabeth then tells Kessler he is no longer welcome in her home for supporting Drew's plan to go to war, but relents when Kessler reveals that Margaret's parents were murdered by the Nazis.

Drew decides to go to Canada without his parents' permission. Kessler intercepts him at the train station during a rain storm and brings Drew back home but is greatly fatigued by his ordeal in the rain. Elizabeth begs Kessler to admit that he is her husband, but he steadfastly refuses. Instead, he implores her to forget the past and live in the present.

Elizabeth goes upstairs and tells Drew that he can join the RAF and Kessler leaves. Back at home, Kessler collapses as he tries to burn one of Elizabeth's letters. The next day, the Hamiltons arrive to thank Kessler for bringing Drew home and learn of his death. Elizabeth comforts the distraught Margaret and the Hamiltons instinctively adopt her and take her to their home leaving the partially burnt letter in the fireplace.

Cast
 Claudette Colbert as Elizabeth Hamilton 
 Orson Welles as John Andrew MacDonald/Erik Kessler 
 George Brent as Lawrence Hamilton 
 Lucile Watson as Aunt Jessica Hamilton [as Lucille Watson]
 Richard Long as Drew Hamilton 
 Natalie Wood as Margaret Ludwig 
 John Wengraf as Dr. Ludwig 
 Sonny Howe as Brian Hamilton 
 Michael Ward as the Drew infant 
 Ian Wolfe as Norton 
 Joyce MacKenzie as Cherry Davis

Production
Natalie Wood's screen test for the role required her to act out the scene where a party popper makes her recall the murder of her character's parents by Nazis. Because she had worked with Irving Pichel on his previous film Happy Land, she was too happy to see him during the test in order to properly cry at first. During production, she had to wear a dental bridge after she lost two of her baby teeth.

Boycott
The film was boycotted in Aiken, South Carolina because Orson Welles mistakenly identified the town as the location of Isaac Woodard's blinding. In July and August 1946, Welles devoted five episodes of Orson Welles Commentaries to the brutal attack on Woodard. Aiken is near Batesburg-Leesville, South Carolina where the attack actually occurred. Welles' initial misidentification of the location led to protests and threats of lawsuits in Aiken, in addition to the boycott of his current film.

Reception
Bosley Crowther of The New York Times skewered the film as a "hackneyed and over-wrought telling of the Enoch Arden tale" in his review for The New York Times. He credits Welles with a "studied display of overacting" that distracts from the poor script. Crowther calls Woods' acting "meretricious", but concludes, "Irving Pichel has directed the film ponderously from Lenore Coffee's vacuous script. Tomorrow seems forever coming after an hour and a half of what goes on."

References

External links 
 
 
 
 
 
 Review of film at Variety

1946 films
1946 romantic drama films
1940s English-language films
1940s American films
American black-and-white films
American romantic drama films
Films directed by Irving Pichel
Films scored by Max Steiner
Films based on American novels
Films set in 1918
Films set in 1938
Films set in Baltimore
RKO Pictures films